More Dirty Dancing (full title: More Dirty Dancing: More Original Music from the Hit Motion Picture) is a follow-up album to the soundtrack to the 1987 film Dirty Dancing. It was released on March 4, 1988, by RCA Records, and made it to number three on both the US and the UK albums charts.  "Do You Love Me", a 1963 Contours hit that features prominently in the film and appears on More Dirty Dancing, was re-issued as a single and became a hit for a second time, peaking at number eleven on the Billboard Hot 100 in August 1988.

David Handelman of Rolling Stone gave the album one star out of five, calling some of the tracks "instrumental idiocies". Stephen Thomas Erlewine of AllMusic gave it two out of five stars saying that the follow-up contained "nothing more than a pleasant collection of oldies and faceless MOR adult contemporary pop".

Track listing
 "(I've Had) The Time of My Life" (instrumental) (The John Morris Orchestra) – 0:37
 "Big Girls Don't Cry" (The Four Seasons) – 2:25
 "Merengue" (Michael Lloyd and Le Disc) – 2:16
 "Some Kind of Wonderful" (The Drifters) – 2:33
 "Johnny's Mambo" (Michael Lloyd & Le Disc) – 3:02
 "Do You Love Me" (The Contours) – 2:49
 "Love Man" (Otis Redding) – 2:14
 "Wipe Out" (The Surfaris) – 2:12
 "These Arms of Mine" (Redding) – 2:26
 "De Todo un Poco" (Michael Lloyd & Le Disc) – 2:27
 "Cry to Me" (Solomon Burke) – 2:23
 "Trot the Fox" (Michael Lloyd & Le Disc) – 2:04
 "Will You Love Me Tomorrow" (The Shirelles) – 2:39
 "Kellerman's Anthem" (The Emile Bergstein Chorale) – 3:17
 "(I've Had) The Time of My Life" (instrumental) (The John Morris Orchestra) – 0:55

Charts

Weekly charts

 Note: The Kent Music Report was the official Australian charts until June 1988. This was succeeded by the ARIA Charts. During this albums run, it appeared on both charts.

Year-end chart

Certifications and sales

References

1988 soundtrack albums
Drama film soundtracks
RCA Records soundtracks
Romance film soundtracks
Sequel albums